Antonella Gambotto-Burke's Mama: Love, Motherhood and Revolution ( / ) is an anthology of essays and interviews with some of the world's leading experts on family and childcare.

The foreword was written by French obstetrician and academic Michel Odent.

References

External links 
  Pinter & Martin 
  "How home-schooling helps me and my daughter bond, by author of Mama, a new book," by Mark Footer, The South China Morning Post, 30 May 2015
  "Women risk losing ability to give birth naturally," by Rozina Sabur, The Telegraph, 24 May 2015
 "Antonella Gambotto-Burke's guide to motherhood," Elle, 9 April 2015
  "Dissident wisdom in Antonella Gambotto-Burke's motherhood statement," by Jack Marx, The Weekend Australian, 9 August 2015 
  "An attached approach to parenting," Life Matters, 24 April 2014
  "Should women really be rushing back to work after giving birth," by Antonella Gambotto-Burke, The Guardian, 11 July 2015

Books about parenting
2015 non-fiction books